Templeton Peak is a peak rising to c.  on the ridge between the head of Ringer Valley and Deshler Valley in the Saint Johns Range of Victoria Land. It was named by the New Zealand Geographic Board in 2005 after Malcolm Templeton, a former New Zealand Foreign Service officer, who held a number of senior positions including that of Permanent Representative to the United Nations, and Deputy Secretary of Foreign Affairs; he is the author of A Wise Adventure – New Zealand and Antarctica 1920 – 1960.

References

Mountains of Victoria Land